Savage Streets is a 1984 American teen vigilante action film directed by Danny Steinmann and starring Linda Blair. The film premiered on October 5, 1984.

Plot

After nearly being run down in the street by a gang known as the Scars, Brenda (Linda Blair) and her deaf-mute younger sister Heather (Linnea Quigley) and their friends trash the car of the gang leader, Jake. Jake exacts his revenge by getting his cohorts to gang-rape Heather. A fight between Brenda and her friends and the Scars at a local nightclub results in Brenda's pregnant, soon-to-be-married friend Francine being murdered by the Scars, who throw her off a viaduct. When Brenda learns who is responsible for Heather's rape, and that Francine is dead and the Scars are responsible, Brenda arms herself and sets out to avenge them. Finding them at a nearby warehouse, Brenda impales one of the gang members, Fargo, with an arrow; kills another, Red, by snapping a bear trap shut upon his neck; and then begins to torture Jake with arrows shot into his thighs and a hunting knife as he hangs by his feet from a gate. However, he then manages to free himself and attacks her. The showdown ends in a nearby paint store; as a burglar alarm blares, Brenda douses Jake in paint and then sets him on fire with a cigarette lighter that she has previously had difficulty getting to produce a flame, just before the police arrive.

The movie ends with Brenda (who is presumably facing charges for the murders of Fargo, Red and Jake), Heather and their surviving friends visiting Francine's grave, and Brenda comments, "At least we set things right," to which her friend Stevie replies, "No, Brenda. You set things right."

Cast
 Linda Blair as Brenda 
 Linnea Quigley as Heather
 Robert Dryer as Jake 
 John Vernon as Underwood 
 Sal Landi as Fargo 
 Johnny Venocur as Vince 
 Scott Mayer as Red 
 Debra Blee as Rachel
 Lisa Freeman as Francine 
 Marcia Karr as Stevie 
 Luisa Leschin as Maria
 Ina Romeo as Stella
 Suzee Slater as Fadden's Girlfriend
 Rebecca Perle as Cindy Clark

Reception
Variety described the film as having "deliciously vulgar dialog and well-directed confrontation scenes." TV Guide awarded the film one star and said of star Linda Blair "This is Blair's best performance since The Exorcist (1973), but that's not saying much." Carol J. Clover in Men, Women, and Chainsaws found Linda Blair unconvincing in her role as a female avenger in her role as Regan MacNeil.

Awards
Razzie Awards
 1986 - Linda Blair (Winner) - Worst Actress
Saturn Award
 1985 - Linda Blair (Nominated) - Best Actress
 1985 - Linnea Quigley (Nominated) - Best Supporting Actress
 1985 - Danny Steinmann, Norman Yonemoto (Nominated) - Best Screenplay

Soundtrack
The soundtrack featuring the theme song "Justice for One" performed by John Farnham was never officially released to the public but may be found on rare promos which were sent to DJs at the time of the picture's release. The reason for the "non-release" was marketing. Some copies of Savage Streets LP, complete with Linda Blair as the main character "Brenda" on the cover, have made it onto online auctions and are stamped "demo only". These releases were put out by the Curb Records group and are now highly sought-after due to Farnham's increased popularity.

Home media
On September 23, 2008, Savage Streets was released in a 2-disc set "Special Edition" by Bryanston Distributors /    Motion Picture Marketing in association with BCI Eclipse / Navarre Corporation with Special Features produced by Red Shirt Productions and Code Red.

References

External links
 
 
 

1984 films
1980s action thriller films
American action thriller films
American independent films
1980s English-language films
Films directed by Danny Steinmann
Films set in Los Angeles
American rape and revenge films
American vigilante films
1984 independent films
1980s vigilante films
Golden Raspberry Award winning films
1980s American films